Dobol Trobol: Lets Get Redi 2 Rambol! is a Filipino comedy film starring Dolphy and Vic Sotto. The film was a box office success, grossing .

Plot
The movie starts at a resort where Mac works as a chef, with Bogart as his sous chef. They were serving foreigners, including some Americans and a Japanese tourist (played by Ya Chang). When pickpockets (led by Kevin Santos) attacks the customers, Mac uses his pots, spatula and pans to inflict damage on the crooks. Meanwhile Arthur, along with a gang, tried to target Mac's friend and the resort owner, but Arthur relented, repulsed the gang members and rescued Mr. Toribio. In turn, he was given a calling card for a job.

When Arthur arrived at the resort, he was forced to take an exam by HR personnel, unknown to her that Arthur is hired by Mr. Toribio himself. He was hired along with an applicant named Nemo, Mac thought Arthur is a guest. But he was shocked when he knew that Arthur will join him as a partner, while Nemo acts as Bogart's partner. From there Mac's hatred and anger towards Turo began, not only that he was fooled, but when he was forced to share his room for the newcomer. The war starts between the both of them, from Turo stopping Mac's snores by tying his head, sealing his nose with pinchers and eyes with 2 coins, which he chokes Turo for the scandal, framing Mac when he was discovered by Vivian's boyfriend, Mac putting laxatives on Turo's porridge, got eaten the spiked soup and contracted diarrhea, also incidentally Vivian was there, and toilet humor ensues until his arrival in the toilet, putting fire ants on Turo's clothes and replacing toothpaste with elastomeric sealant, which he was stuck at. They divided the room equally. He seeks help of Nemo and Bogart to pull the toothbrush, when they pulled the brush, the stuck molar was pulled also.

All things change when he saw Mac's daughter, Boni arrives at the resort. He fell in love at her but got shocked when he found out that Boni is Mac's daughter. He tried to advance Boni, to no avail, including stealing Mac's flowers (courtesy of Nikki), meeting up with her, and most of all, via a paper plane, but got intercepted by Mac, and the paper plane became a Japanese Zero plane, firing bullets before crashing down. When Turo reads it, it was full of swear words, just as Mac goes out of the terrace, with Japanese tie in the forehead, a katana in right hand and a Japanese flag in the left, acting like a cross between a Japanese samurai and a Japanese soldier, while shouting "Tora Tora, Turo! Turo,Bakero! Kamikaze-ne! Banzai Nippon! Turo Pugot Uro! Turo Pugot Uro!" ("Tora Tora ,Turo! Turo, Fool! Kamikaze! Long Live Japan! Tuto, Decapitate! Turo, Decapitate!"). Turo runs away scared and Mac scolds his daughter, saying "kiri kiri ne! chorva chorva ne!" and ends with saying "irrashaimase!" ("thank you very much!") while bowing.

Mac's problematic past is revealed when Boni wants her daddy to attend her birthday along with her mother, a rich person. She wants to stop Mac's love, being a chef and focus on her company as owner, much to her disagreement and ends up leaving the house to help Toribio's resort. He was affected on his job that the couple (Epy Quizon and Dexter Doria) that wants to invest at the resort became pissed and cancelled the investment. In order to help him, Turo, Mr. Toribio, Nemo and Bogart tricked Mac by telling them they have a catering service in Manila, but in Boni's birthday. Meanwhile, in a convenience store, a confrontation ensued when 2 perverted men tried to harass 2 customers (Pia Guanio and Zsa Zsa Padilla). They defend the women and thank them, Mac pulling an anti-asthma medicated nebulizer. Mac was shocked when he learned when he arrived at his own house. He was confronted by her wife, for not being a husband and a boss on the family. There is a chef, named Paco, an overly perfectionist, gay chef from Spain. He is the head chef, while Nemo, Bogart and Arthur became assistant, cook and server, respectively. Problem arose when Paco was accidentally knocked out by a rolling pin, replacing him with Mac by force. The party continued and the chef was introduced, Mac. His wife and daughter became happy and his wife praises him, but not until Paco chased Arthur and gang with a rolling pin. After the end of the party, Mac stayed at his home, while Arthur, Nemo and Bogart return to the resort.

Mac saw Turo packing his clothes, fulfilling his promise to Mac that he will leave the resort if he reconciles with his family, and to end his feelings to her daughter, but Boni disagrees and states that she loves Arthur. The couples hugged each other, as Nemo knocks Bogart's head.

Cast
Dolphy† as Macario/Mac
Vic Sotto as Arthur "Turo" Calaycay
Carmi Martin as Gabriela
Jose Manalo as Nemo
Wally Bayola as Bogart
Riza Santos as Boni
BJ Forbes as Moo/Nikki
Pocholo Montes as Mr. Toribio
Fritz Ynfante as Chef Paco
Sugar Mercado as Information Officer
Ricky Davao as guest/investor
Dexter Doria as guest/investor
Ya Chang as guest
Daiana Menezes as Vivian
Epi Quizon as guest
Pia Guanio as convenience store customer
Zsa Zsa Padilla as convenience store customer
EB Babes as guests/billiards players

Cameo
Zsa Zsa Padilla as herself/customer
Pia Guanio as herself/customer
Dolphy dies 2012

Reception

Box office
The film was a box office success. The film grossed  on its opening weekend.

Awards

References

External links
 

2008 films
Philippine comedy films
2000s Tagalog-language films
APT Entertainment films
M-Zet Productions films
2000s English-language films
Films directed by Tony Y. Reyes